Masroor Anwar (6 January 1944 – 1 April 1996) was a ghazal poet, film song lyricist and a film screenwriter.  He wrote the lyrics for 'Ko Ko Korina', South Asia's first pop song, and working alongside Sohail Rana, film director Pervez Malik and film producer and actor Waheed Murad in the 1960s, was part of the country's golden age of cinema helping establish Karachi as a major hub for film production.

Early life and career
He was born in 1944 in Shimla, Punjab, British India and following the partition, moved to Karachi, Pakistan. In Karrachi, he grew up to be a chubby and baby-faced young man. After finishing his basic education from Government Islamia Science College, Karachi, he worked for Pakistan International Airlines (PIA) for a short period and later for Radio Pakistan as a staff artist because of his deep interest in poetry and literature. At Radio Pakistan, he was helped by the film actor Ibrahim Nafees who introduced him to the film producer Iqbal Shehzad. He was hired by Iqbal Shehzad to write his first film song for his film Banjaran (1962). Then he became part of a group of four people in Karachi – Waheed Murad, Pervez Malik, Sohail Rana and Masroor Anwar that made many big hit films together in the 1960s and 1970s.

Death and legacy
He died in Lahore on 1 April 1996 at age 51 and was laid to rest at Karim Block graveyard, Iqbal town, Lahore.

In the history of Pakistani cinema, Masroor Anwar was considered one of the best film song writers. Besides film songs, he also wrote some touching popular patriotic songs.

Popular songs

Awards and recognition
 Nigar Award for Best Screenplay Writer for film Saiqa in 1968
 Nigar Award for Best Screenplay Writer for film Sughaat in 1970
 Nigar Award for Best Film Song Lyricist in 1970 for film Anjuman
 Pride of Performance Award by the President of Pakistan (1997)

References

External links
 Filmography of Masroor Anwar on IMDb website

1944 births
1996 deaths
Pakistani poets
Pakistani lyricists
Pakistani screenwriters
People from Shimla
Urdu-language poets from Pakistan
20th-century Pakistani poets
Nigar Award winners
Recipients of the Pride of Performance
20th-century screenwriters